M-Azing is a candy bar manufactured by Mars, Incorporated. It is a milk chocolate candy bar with M&M's Minis inside. It has been available in crunchy and peanut butter flavors, in singles and miniatures varieties.

History
The product was originally introduced in Singles and Funsize formats in 2004. In 2005, a Minis format was launched. In 2006, the company discontinued all but the Crunchy Singles variety of the candy bar, and now has a "Now with better taste" sticker on it. Mars, Incorporated stated that they planned to rebrand the bar in 2008, but this did not happen.

In 2013, M-Azing was relaunched under the name M&M'S Chocolate Bar.

Ad campaign 
The advertisements for M-Azing bars included people doing amazing things such as a man balancing a washing machine on his teeth.

See also
 List of chocolate bar brands

References

External links

Mars confectionery brands
Chocolate bars
Food and drink introduced in 2004
M&M's